Kedar Sigdel is a Nepali communist politician and a member of the House of Representatives of the federal parliament of Nepal. He was elected under the first-past-the-post (FPTP) system representing CPN UML from Tanahun-2 constituency. He defeated his nearest rival Shankar Bhandari of Nepali Congress by acquiring 32,924 votes to Bhandari's 29,645. This was the first time he was elected to parliament. Following the merger of CPN UML with CPN (Maoist Centre) to form Nepal Communist Party (NCP), he represents the new party in parliament.

References

Living people
Communist Party of Nepal (Unified Marxist–Leninist) politicians
Place of birth missing (living people)
Nepal Communist Party (NCP) politicians
Nepal MPs 2017–2022
1963 births